Ceriodaphnia is a genus of the Daphniidae; the genus was described in 1853 by James Dwight Dana.  It has cosmopolitan distribution.

Species:
 Ceriodaphnia dubia (Richard, 1894)
 Ceriodaphnia quadrangula (O.F. Müller, 1785)
 Ceriodaphnia reticulata (Jurine, 1820)

References

Cladocera
Branchiopoda genera